The Aiken Stand Complex is a historic pair of buildings at the junction of Royalton Turnpike and Sayer Road in rural Barnard, Vermont.  Built , they were the centerpiece of a small village that flourished in the first half of the 19th century, when the Turnpike was the principal north–south route through the region.  The buildings were listed on the National Register of Historic Places in 1983.

Description and history
The Aiken Stand Complex stands in what is now a comparatively remote and rural area of eastern Barnard.  At the southeast corner of Royalton Turnpike and Sayer Road stands the main building, a -story wood-frame structure, with a side gable roof, large central chimney, clapboarded exterior, five-bay front facade, and rubblestone foundation.  Its interior and exterior are predominantly Federal in their style. Across the turnpike to the west stands a -story Cape style structure, with a similar exterior, but with Greek Revival features, including sidelight windows flanking the entrance.

The location was the site of a tavern from at least 1781, when Solomon Aiken was documented to be operating one.  His business benefited from the establishment of the Woodstock and Royalton Turnpike, a toll road, in 1800, and he built the main tavern building about 1805 to handle increased business.  The Cape was added in 1835 to handle overflow traffic and provide more space for the Aiken family.  Notable visitors to the tavern included President James Madison in 1817, and the Marquis de Lafayette in 1824.  At its height, the tavern was the center of a small village, with a blacksmith's shop and school.  The turnpike declined in importance after the construction of railroads in the state, and the tavern ended as a business in the 1870s.  The buildings were used as private residences until the mid-20th century, and were then abandoned.  They underwent restoration in the early 1980s.

See also
National Register of Historic Places listings in Windsor County, Vermont

References

External links
 

Houses on the National Register of Historic Places in Vermont
National Register of Historic Places in Windsor County, Vermont
Federal architecture in Vermont
Houses completed in 1805
Buildings and structures in Barnard, Vermont